Gleditsia caspica, the Caspian locust or Persian honeylocust, is a species of Gleditsia native to western Asia, in the Caucasus region of Azerbaijan and northern Iran, close to the Caspian Sea.

It is a medium-sized deciduous tree growing to 12 m tall, with the trunk covered in numerous, 10–20 cm long branched spines. The leaves are pinnate or bipinnate, up to 25 cm long, with 12–20 leaflets; bipinnate leaves have six to eight pinnae. The leaflets are up to 5 cm long and 2 cm broad. The flowers are greenish, produced in racemes up to 10 cm long. The fruit is a pod 20 cm long and 3 cm broad.

It is closely related to Gleditsia japonica (syn. G. horrida) from eastern Asia, and is treated as a subspecies of it by some botanists, Gleditsia horrida subsp. caspica (Desf.) J.Paclt.

See also
Gaz (candy)

References

5.	Nourmohammadi, K., Rahimi, D., Naghdi, R., & Kartoolinejad, D. (2016). Effects of physical and chemical treatments of seed dormancy breaking on seedling quality index (QI) of Caspian locust (Gleditsia caspica Desf.). Austrian Journal of Forest Science, 133(2), 157-171. https://www.researchgate.net/profile/Davoud_Kartooli/publication/306065561_Effects_of_seed_dormancy_breaking_treatments_on_seedling_QI_of_Caspian_locust_Seite_157_Effects_of_physical_and_chemical_treatments_of_seed_dormancy_breaking_on_seedling_quality_index_QI_of_Caspian_lo/links/57ad919708ae42ba52b3b71f/Effects-of-seed-dormancy-breaking-treatments-on-seedling-QI-of-Caspian-locust-Seite-157-Effects-of-physical-and-chemical-treatments-of-seed-dormancy-breaking-on-seedling-quality-index-QI-of-Caspian-lo.pdf

caspica
Flora of Azerbaijan
Trees of Western Asia
Trees of Mediterranean climate
Taxa named by René Louiche Desfontaines